Joelly Belleka (born 27 August 1995, in Orléans) is a French basketball player who plays for club Arras of the Ligue Féminine de Basketball the top league of basketball of women in France.

References

French women's basketball players
1995 births
Living people
Sportspeople from Orléans